Wrestlemaniac (also known as El Mascarado Massacre) is a 2006 American slasher film written and directed by Jesse Baget and starring Rey Misterio.

Plot

On their way to Cabo San Lucas, the cast and crew of a low-budget film get lost and come upon La Sangre De Dios, a ghost town with a spine-tingling legend about an insane Mexican wrestler. The leader of the pack and first time director, Alphonse, likes the town's gritty appearance and decides it would be the perfect setting for his film. The crew positions the camera and snaps on the lights. When Alphonse yells "Action!", it arouses the famous and now insane Luchador, "El Mascarado", who begins a game of his own. One by one, the cast and crew are snatched, beaten and dragged to a bloody death. The few left alive must figure out how to beat the wrestler at his own deadly game, or die trying.

Cast 
 Rey Misterio - El Mascarado
 Adam Huss - Alfonse
 Jeremy Radin - Steve
 Leyla Milani - Dallas
 Margaret Scarborough - Debbie
 Catherine Wreford - Daisy
 Zack Bennett - Jimbo
 Irwin Keyes - The Stranger
 Fred Tatasciore - El Mascarado's Voice
 Tabbert Fiiller - Spanish Doctor's Voice

Release

Home media
Wrestlemaniac was released on DVD by Revolver Entertainment on April 30, 2007. It was later released by Lionsgate Home Entertainment on March 11, 2008.

Reception
Daryl Loomis of DVD Verdict gave the film a negative review, in his summary of the film he stated, "Had Wrestlemaniac taken place in its intended location and had the cast and crew more time to put the film together, it likely would have been far better. As it stands, there's very little to like here. I appreciate the director's love of low-budget filmmaking, and his brutal honesty in the commentary is welcome, but there are too many holes to recommend to anybody who isn't suckered in by the wrestling and horror combination". Steve Barton of Dread Central rated the film a score of 3.5 out of 5, calling it "cheesy fun". Andrew Smith from Popcorn Pictures gave the film a score of 5/10, writing, "In this current fad of torture, sadism and being as authentic and serious as possible, it’s nice to see a film come along with no designs on being anything than just a fun slasher. Wrestlemaniac is an enjoyable timewaster with a decent villain and some decent moments."

Sequel
The film's director Jesse Baget stated in an interview with Bloody Good Horror that he plans of filming a sequel for the film stating "I definitely have some ideas for a sequel and I have a couple other projects that I’m getting underway, but I would definitely like to come back to it, just because I think with a slightly bigger budget … there’s just so much more we could do with the Mexican Wrestling concept. You know, put him on some motorcycles, have some midget fights. there’s a lot to do with it. And I’d want to make it a little more of an action horror, just a real bloody action kind of film rather than so much of a slasher film that it was this time”.

References

External links 
 
 
 

2006 films
2006 horror films
2000s serial killer films
2000s slasher films
American serial killer films
American slasher films
2000s English-language films
Films about pornography
Films set in Mexico
Films shot in California
Lucha libre films
Sport wrestling films
American monster movies
American science fiction horror films
2000s science fiction horror films
2000s monster movies
American exploitation films
American splatter films
2000s American films